O with grave (О̀ о̀; italics: О̀ о̀) is a letter of the Cyrillic script. In all its forms it looks exactly like the Latin letter O with grave (Ò ò Ò ò).

Usage
 is mainly used in South Slavic languages, mostly importantly in Bulgarian as its used to differentiate homophones.

Words that use these kinds of letters are used in the larger part in Bulgarian and the accent used. Because this accent existed in the past in all Bulgarian dialects, it is called dynamic accent. Its characteristics are almost the same as those in the accent of the other south-eastern Slavic languages, i. e. it is variable, shifting, indefinite; however, its innate laws and causes are not yet explained: òглав, òдръки, òткраки.

Computing codes
Being a relatively recent letter, not present in any legacy 8-bit Cyrillic encoding, the letter О́ is not represented directly by a precomposed character in Unicode either; it has to be composed as О+◌̀ (U+0300).

See also
O o : Latin letter O
Ò ò : Latin letter O with grave - a Kashubian letter
О о : Cyrillic letter О
Cyrillic characters in Unicode

References

Cyrillic letters with diacritics
Letters with grave